Australia competed at the 1984 Winter Olympics in Sarajevo, Yugoslavia.
Eleven athletes participated, competing in alpine skiing, biathlon, cross-country skiing, figure skating, and speed skating. Australia's best result was 19th in downhill skiing by Steven Lee.

This was the first Olympics in which Australia competed in biathlon.

Alpine skiing

Men

Women

Biathlon

Men

Cross-country skiing

Men

Figure skating

Speed skating

See also
Australia at the Winter Olympics

References

External links
Australia NOC
Olympic Winter Institute of Australia
"2002 Australian Winter Olympic Team Guide" PDF file
"The Compendium: Official Australian Olympic Statistics 1896-2002" Australian Olympic Committee  (Inconsistencies in sources mentioned in Wikibooks:Errata/0702234257)

Nations at the 1984 Winter Olympics
1984
Winter sports in Australia
1984 in Australian sport